The Saints–Vikings rivalry is a rivalry between the New Orleans Saints and Minnesota Vikings.

The Vikings have dominated most of the series. However, the resurgence of the Saints under Sean Payton and Drew Brees made the organization competitive with the Vikings. Games between these two teams have been consequential both in the regular season and playoffs for the NFC. Due to regular playoff matches between the two teams, the rivalry has become noteworthy in the last 20 years.

The Vikings lead the all-time series 24–13. The two clubs have met five times in the playoffs, with the Vikings holding a 4–1 record. The Vikings won 20 of the first 27 games (.741) through 2009, though the rivalry has been more competitive since then.

Notable moments and games
 In January 1988, the Saints made their postseason debut by hosting the Vikings in the NFC wildcard game. New Orleans scored a touchdown on its first drive, but Minnesota took a 31–10 halftime lead and won 44–10.
 In January 2001, the 10–6 Saints traveled to Minnesota for a playoff game against the 11–5 Vikings. Vikings QB Daunte Culpepper threw for 302 yards as the Vikings defeated the Saints 34–16. 
 In 2002, the 4–10 Vikings played the 9–5 Saints in a must-win game for the Saints. The Saints took a seven-point lead with just over 5 minutes remaining, but the Vikings responded with a touchdown pass from Culpepper to Randy Moss with five seconds left, narrowing the gap to a single point. Instead of kicking the extra point to tie the game, the Vikings elected to go for two; Culpepper ran the ball in himself to give the Vikings a 32–31 win and the Saints went on to miss the playoffs.
In January 2010, the 12–4 Vikings traveled to New Orleans to play the 13–3 Saints in the NFC Championship Game. Despite dominating the Saints in terms of total yards, time of possession, first downs, and other key stats, the Vikings committed five costly turnovers (including three from quarterback Brett Favre), and the Saints managed to hold on for a 31–28 overtime win.  This game was pivotal in the eventual changing of the league overtime rules, as the Vikings did not get a chance to score in overtime after the Saints. Additionally, the Saints organization was criticized for the volume and intensity of hits on Favre in Bountygate. 
In 2010, the Vikings traveled to New Orleans for a rematch of the NFC Championship game in one of the most anticipated games of the season. The Saints once again prevailed over the Vikings, this time by a score of 14–9. The Vikings season spiraled out of control as they fell from 12–4 to 6–10, which included head coach Brad Childress being fired mid-season, the Metrodome collapsing mid-season, and the lackluster play from Brett Favre in what was his final season in the NFL. Meanwhile, the Saints finished 11–5 (second in the division behind the 13–3 Falcons), and went on to lose to the Seahawks in the Beast Quake game.
In the 2017 playoffs, the Saints traveled to Minnesota for an NFC Divisional Round Game. The Vikings jumped out to a 17–0 lead, controlling all key stats. However, the Saints mounted a second-half comeback and eventually took a 24–23 lead with under a minute to play. With ten seconds left, Vikings quarterback Case Keenum completed a pass to Stefon Diggs, who evaded a tackle attempt by Saints safety Marcus Williams and took the ball into the endzone for a walk off touchdown. This became known as the Minneapolis Miracle.
In 2019, the 10–6 Vikings traveled to New Orleans as heavy underdogs in an NFC Wild Card Game. Although the Saints jumped out to a quick 3–0 lead, the Saints struggled to muster the kind of offense they were known for in 2019. The Vikings at one point led 20–10 before the Saints forced overtime on a last-second field goal. In overtime, Vikings quarterback Kirk Cousins led the team on a drive that resulted in a touchdown to Kyle Rudolph.
In 2020, the Vikings played in New Orleans for a Christmas Day match-up. With the score 31–27 after three quarters, the Saints scored 21 points in the fourth quarter to pull away 52–33. This game represented the worst Vikings' defensive performance in franchise history as they gave up 583 yards of offense to the Saints and allowed running back Alvin Kamara to tie the NFL record for touchdowns in one game (6). This game eliminated the Vikings from playoff contention.
In 2022, the teams faced off in London in week 4. The Saints needed to make a field goal late in the fourth quarter to tie the game. A 32-yard pass from quarterback Andy Dalton to rookie receiver Chris Olave got the Saints to the Vikings' 43-yard line, setting up kicker Wil Lutz for a 61-yard field goal. He had made a 60-yard kick less than two minutes earlier, but with the game on the line, he hit the left upright and then the crossbar, and the Vikings won 28–25.

Game results

|-
| 
| style="| Saints  20–17 
| Tulane Stadium
| Saints  1–0
| First meeting, and the only one prior to the AFL-NFL merger
|-

|-
| 
| style="| Vikings  26–0
| Metropolitan Stadium
| Tied  1–1
| First meeting at Metropolitan Stadium
|-
| 
| style="| Vikings  23–10
| Tulane Stadium
| Vikings  2–1
| Last meeting at Tulane Stadium
|-
| 
| style="| Vikings  37–6
| Metropolitan Stadium
| Vikings  3–1
|
|-
| 
| style="| Vikings  29–9
| Metropolitan Stadium
| Vikings  4–1
| Vikings lose Super Bowl IX 
|-
| 
| style="| Vikings  20–7
| Louisiana Superdome
| Vikings  5–1
| First meeting at Louisiana Superdome
|-
| 
| style="| Vikings  40–9
| Louisiana Superdome
| Vikings  6–1
| Vikings lose Super Bowl XI
|-
| 
| style="| Saints  31–24 
| Louisiana Superdome
| Vikings  6–2
|
|-

|-
| 
| style="| Vikings 23–20
| Louisiana Superdome
| Vikings  7–2
| First game for interim Saints coach Dick Stanfel; Saints fall to 0-13 and finish 1-15
|-
| 
| style="| Vikings 20–10
| Metropolitan Stadium
| Vikings  8–2
| Last meeting at Metropolitan Stadium
|-
| 
| style="| Saints 17–16
| Louisiana Superdome
| Vikings  8–3
|
|-
| 
| style="| Saints 30–23
| Hubert H. Humphrey Metrodome
| Vikings  8–4
| First meeting at Hubert H. Humphrey MetrodomeLast game for Saints coach Bum Phillips
|-
| 
| style="| Vikings 33–17
| Hubert H. Humphrey Metrodome
| Vikings  9–4
| 
|-
! 1987 playoffs
! style="| Vikings 44–10
! Louisiana Superdome
! Vikings  10–4
! NFC Wild Card Round; first postseason meeting in the series, and the first postseason game in Saints history
|-
| 
| style="| Vikings 45–3
| Hubert H. Humphrey Metrodome
| Vikings  11–4
|
|-

|-
| 
| style="| Vikings  32–3
| Hubert H. Humphrey Metrodome
| Vikings  12–4
|
|-
| 
| style="| Saints  26–0 
| Louisiana Superdome
| Vikings  12–5
|
|-
| 
| style="| Saints  17–14
| Hubert H. Humphrey Metrodome
| Vikings  12–6
|
|-
| 
| style="| Vikings  21–20
| Hubert H. Humphrey Metrodome
| Vikings  13–6
|
|-
| 
| style="| Vikings  43–24 
| Hubert H. Humphrey Metrodome
| Vikings  14–6
|
|-
| 
| style="| Vikings  31–24
| Hubert H. Humphrey Metrodome
| Vikings  15–6
|
|-

|-
! 2000 playoffs
! style="| Vikings  34–16
! Hubert H. Humphrey Metrodome
! Vikings  16–6
! NFC Divisional Round; second postseason meeting
|-
| 
| style="| Saints  28–15 
| Louisiana Superdome
| Vikings  16–7
| 
|-
| 
| style="| Vikings  32–31 
| Louisiana Superdome
| Vikings  17–7
| Saints wear alternate gold jersey for only time
|-
| 
| style="| Vikings  38–31 
| Louisiana Superdome
| Vikings  18–7
| 
|-
| 
| style="| Vikings  33–16
| Hubert H. Humphrey Metrodome
| Vikings  19–7
| 
|-
| 
| style="| Vikings  30–27 
| Louisiana Superdome
| Vikings  20–7
| 
|-
! 2009 playoffs
! style="| Saints  
! Louisiana Superdome
! Vikings  20–8
! NFC Championship Game; third postseason meeting, first overtime game in the series; Saints win Super Bowl XLIV.
|-

|-
| 
| style="| Saints  14–9
| Louisiana Superdome
| Vikings  20–9
| NFL Kickoff Game
|-
| 
| style="| Saints  42–20
| Hubert H. Humphrey Metrodome
| Vikings  20–10
| Final meeting at Hubert H. Humphrey Metrodome
|-
| 
| style="| Saints  20–9
| Mercedes-Benz Superdome
| Vikings  20–11
| 
|-
| 
| style="| Vikings  29–19
| U.S. Bank Stadium
| Vikings  21–11
| First meeting at U.S. Bank Stadium
|-
! 2017 playoffs
! style="| Vikings  29–24
! U.S. Bank Stadium
! Vikings  22–11
! NFC Divisional Round; fourth postseason meeting; the Minneapolis Miracle marks the first time in NFL postseason history that a game-winning touchdown is scored on the final play of regulation.
|-
| 
| style="| Saints  30–20
| U.S. Bank Stadium
| Vikings  22–12
|-
! 2019 playoffs
! style="| Vikings   
! Mercedes-Benz Superdome
! Vikings  23–12
! NFC Wild Card Round; fifth postseason meeting; the Saints' season ends on the final play of a playoff loss for the third straight season, with two of the three against the Vikings.
|-

|-
| 
| style="| Saints  52–33 
| Mercedes-Benz Superdome
| Vikings  23–13
| Christmas Day game; Saints eliminate the Vikings from playoff contention.
|-
|-
| 
| style="| Vikings  28–25
| Tottenham Hotspur Stadium
| Vikings  24–13
| Game played as part of the NFL International Series, officially a Saints home game
|-
| 
|
| U.S. Bank Stadium
|
|
|-

|-
| Regular season
| style="|
| 
| 
| Vikings 1–0 in London (officially a Saints home game)
|-
| Postseason
| style="|
| 
| 
| NFC Wild Card Round: 1987, 2019; NFC Divisional Round: 2000, 2017; NFC Championship Game: 2009
|-
| Regular and postseason 
| style="|
| 
| 
| 
|-

See also
 Minneapolis Miracle
 New Orleans Saints bounty scandal

References

Further reading

New Orleans Saints
Minnesota Vikings
National Football League rivalries
Minnesota Vikings rivalries
New Orleans Saints rivalries